Sorin Cârțu (born 12 November 1955) is a former football striker and football coach. Cârțu won two Romanian Championships and four Romanian Cups with Universitatea Craiova. As a coach, he succeeded to win in the 1990–91 season with Universitatea Craiova both trophies in Romania, Divizia A and the Romanian Cup.

During CFR's Champions League tie against Swiss Super League champions FC Basel at St. Jakob-Park, Cârțu destroyed a section of the dugout with his foot after his side conceded a 75th-minute goal. After the match, CFR Cluj sacked Cârțu, citing his behaviour in the game as the reason behind his dismissal.

International stats

Honours

Player
Universitatea Craiova
 Divizia A: 1979–80, 1980–81
 Cupa României: 1976–77, 1977–78, 1980–81, 1982–83

Manager
Universitatea Craiova
 Divizia A: 1990–91
 Cupa României: 1990–91

Rapid București
 Cupa României runner-up: 1994–95

Extensiv Craiova
 Divizia B: 1998–99

Oțelul Galați
 Cupa României runner-up: 2003–04

Career statistics
 Divizia A: 283 games – 107 goals
 Divizia B: 82 games – 27 goals

External links
 

1955 births
Living people
People from Dolj County
Romanian footballers
Association football forwards
Romania international footballers
CS Universitatea Craiova players
Romanian football managers
CS Universitatea Craiova managers
FC U Craiova 1948 managers
FC Rapid București managers
Veria F.C. managers
ASC Oțelul Galați managers
FC Argeș Pitești managers
FC Politehnica Timișoara managers
FC Progresul București managers
CS Mioveni managers
CS Pandurii Târgu Jiu managers
CFR Cluj managers
FC Steaua București managers
FC Brașov (1936) managers
FC Politehnica Iași (2010) managers
Romanian expatriates in Greece
Expatriate football managers in Greece